Liu Mao'en (8 June 1898 – 24 April 1981) was a Kuomintang (Chinese Nationalist Party) general from Gong County, Henan, who commanded the 14th Army Group when the Second Sino-Japanese War broke out.

Service record

 1898, Born
 1937, Lieutenant general, Commander, 15 Army
 1941, Commander, 14 Army Group
 1944, Commander, Henan Province Garrison
 1944, Chairman, Henan Province
 1981, Dies

References
 http://pwencycl.kgbudge.com/L/i/Liu_Mao-en.htm

National Revolutionary Army generals from Henan
1898 births
1981 deaths
People from Zhengzhou